HMS Wolsey (D98)  was a W-class destroyer of the British Royal Navy that saw service in the final months of World War I, in the Nanking incident of 1927, and in World War II.

Construction and commissioning
Wolsey, the first Royal Navy ship of the name, was ordered on 9 December 1916 as part of the 10th Order of the 1916–1917 Naval Programme and was laid down by John I. Thornycroft & Company at Woolston, Hampshire, England, on 28 March 1917. Launched on 16 March 1918, she was completed on 14 May 1918 and commissioned the same day. Her original pennant number became G40 in June 1918; it was changed to D98 during the interwar period.

Service history

World War I
Upon completion, Wolsey was assigned to the Grand Fleet, based at Scapa Flow in the Orkney Islands, in which she served for the rest of World War I.

Interwar
After the conclusion of World War I, Wolsey served in the Atlantic Fleet. In the late 1920s, she operated on the China Station. After the British river steamer SS Kutwo collided with and sank a Chinese troop-carrying launch on the Yangtze River and Chinese authorities threatened to seize her at Nanking in early March 1927, Wolsey arrived on the scene and came alongside Kutwo to repel by force any Chinese attempt to board her, and Wolseys sailors also boarded a British hulk nearby and forced off Chinese students who had boarded it to stage a demonstration; the light cruiser  soon joined Wolsey at Nanking as a reinforcement. She remained at Nanking, prepared for further action, until all foreign refugees were safely aboard the ships on the evening of 25 March 1927.

By the early 1930s, Wolsey was part of the Mediterranean Fleet. She later was decommissioned and placed in reserve at Malta.

In 1938, the Royal Navy selected her for conversion into an antiaircraft escort destroyer at the Royal Navy Dockyard at Valletta, Malta.

World War II

January – June 1940
Wolsey still was undergoing her conversion and a refit at Malta when the United Kingdom entered World War II on 3 September 1939. In January 1940 she began post-conversion acceptance trials and pre-deployment work-ups at Malta. With all work completed on 21 January 1940, her pennant number was changed to L02, and she was selected for service in home waters. She proceeded from Malta to Gibraltar, where on 29 January 1940, she and the sloop  began a voyage to Liverpool as the escort of Convoy HG 17F.

After her arrival at Liverpool, Wolsey was assigned to Western Approaches Command and began convoy escort and patrol duty in the Western Approaches. On 10 May 1940, she was transferred to the Commander-in-Chief, Dover to support Allied military operations during the German offensive into France, Luxembourg, Belgium, and the Netherlands that began that month. On 16 May, she and the destroyer  bombarded German ground forces at Escault in Offrethun, France, and Wolsey again bombarded Escault on 17 May. On 22 May she and the destroyer  escorted the cargo ship City of Christchurch as City of Christchurch carried heavy motor vehicles and tanks from Southampton to Calais, France. On 23 May, Wolsey embarked a demolition party for Le Havre and then steamed to Calais to assist in the evacuation of British citizens before returning to Dover. On 25 May, she and the destroyer  engaged German 150-mm (5.9-inch) howitzers in defence of the evacuation of Calais.

On 26 May 1940, Wolsey was assigned to Operation Dynamo, the evacuation of Allied troops from the beaches at Dunkirk, France. She embarked evacuees from small craft offshore on 27 May and disembarked 102 evacuated troops at Dover on 28 May. She delivered another 315 troops from Dunkirk at Dover on 29 May. On 30 May, she made two evacuation voyages, carrying 616 troops to Dover on the first one and 1,065 on the second. On 31 May while at Dunkirk, she suffered damage when a fire broke out in her degaussing equipment and in a collision with a merchant ship, but despite her damage she deployed offshore to serve as a wireless transmitter link between Dunkirk and Dover and later in the day landed 425 evacuated troops at Dover. She carried another 535 troops from Dunkirk to Dover on 1 June before being withdrawn from evacuation operations later in the day for repairs.

June 1940-Summer 1945
Wolsey proceeded to Portsmouth on 2 June 1940, where she entered the Royal Navy Dockyard on 3 June for repairs. Upon their completion, she began convoy defence operations and anti-invasion patrols in the North Sea in July 1940. In August 1940, she returned to convoy escort duty with the Western Approaches Command.

In January 1941, Wolsey was transferred to the Rosyth Escort Force based at Rosyth, Scotland, to escort coastal convoys in the North Sea and Northwestern Approaches. By October 1941, these duties increasingly included operations to intercept German motor torpedo boats – S-boats, known to the Allies as "E-boats" – before they could attack the convoys. On 12 October 1941, she was part of the escort of the northbound coastal convoy FN 31 in the North Sea along with the destroyer  from the Rosyth Escort Force, the escort destroyer  from Harwich, and motor gunboats of the Royal Navy Coastal Forces when nine German E-boats of the 2nd Flotilla attacked, sinking the merchant ships SS Chevington and SS Roy; the escorts engaged the E-boats and gave chase as they withdrew, but were unable to destroy any of them. On 20 November, the convoy came under heavy attack by 2nd Flotilla E-boats, which sank the colliers Aruba and Waldinge and the Royal Fleet Auxiliary tanker RFA War Mehtar; the latter, at 11,681 gross register tons, was the largest ship sunk by an E-boat in the North Sea during World War II.

Wolsey was "adopted" by the civil community of Spennymoor in County Durham, England, in a Warship Week national savings campaign in December 1941. She continued on convoy escort and patrol duty in the North Sea – having radar and radio telephone equipment installed in 1942 to improve her ability to detect German aircraft and small surface craft and give her a greater capability to warn other ships of the approach of enemy aircraft and ships and to communicate while manoeuvering – without further major incident until the surrender of Germany in early May 1945. She took no part in any operations related to the Allied invasion of Normandy in the summer of 1944.

After Germanys surrender, Wolsey supported Allied forces reoccupying Norway, and on 14 May 1945 joined the destroyer  in escorting minesweepers as they cleared the entrance to Stavanger.

Decommissioning and disposal
Wolsey was decommissioned in the summer of 1945 and transferred to the reserve; by October 1945 she was no longer on the Royal Navys active list. She was placed on the disposal list in 1946 and sold on 4 March 1947 to BISCO for scrapping. She later was towed to the yard of T. Young and Company at Sunderland to be broken up.

Notes

Bibliography

External links
 Line drawing of HMS Wolsey (L02)

 

1918 ships
V and W-class destroyers of the Royal Navy
World War I destroyers of the United Kingdom
World War II destroyers of the United Kingdom
Ships built by John I. Thornycroft & Company